The following is a list of CDs and DVDs by Blue Man Group. It includes all Blue Man Group limited editions and out-of-print releases.

CD
Albums
Audio (1999)
The Complex (2003)
Three (2016)

Singles/EPs
Mandelgroove (2000)
Complex Sampler Single (2003)
Current (2003)
The Grinch Sampler CD (2003)
I Feel Love (2004) (Features "I Feel Love" music video)
Chicago Practice (2005)
Boston Roll (2005)
Las Vegas 4 Song Sampler (2005)
Live at the Venetian – Las Vegas (2006)
Last Train to Trancentral (Blue Man Group EP) (2006)
Canta Conmigo (2007) (Deluxe Edition in 2008)
How to Be a Megastar Live! (2008)
Shake Your Euphemism (2012)

DVD
Audio (DVD-Audio format, containing Surround Sound 5.1 mix)
Blue Man Group DVD Premium (Promo 2001 DVD)
The Complex Rock Tour Live
Complex 5.1 (Surround Sound 5.1)
Scoring Reel (Scoring DVD from 2004)
Canta Conmigo (5.1 Surround Sound)
Venetian DVD (First show at the Venetian, promotion only)
I Feel Love (Rare Venus Hum DVD Featuring Blue Man Group)
Inside the Tube (from PBS) (Only in 2006)
Instrument Guide (Included in Toyquest Instrument)
Complex Box Set (Box Set of The Complex)
Live in Orlando (Rare sampler DVD of a performance of BMG's Orlando show)
Roof Dwellers Welcome ( Part of a premium welcome package on the Roof Dwellers Blue Man Group site.
How to Be a Megastar Live!

VHS
Audio Video: The Making of Blue Man Group's Debut Album

12" and promotional singles
I Feel Love
The Current
Sing Along
Drumbone
Time to Play

iTunes exclusives
Live at The Venetian – Las Vegas
Last Train to Trancentral (EP)
Rods and Cones

Limited Editions
Sing Along EP featuring Dave Matthews
Las Vegas 4 Song Sampler
Complex Sampler Single
Scoring Reel
Venetian DVD
Inside the Tube
Blue Man Group DVD Premium
Boston Roll
Chicago Practice
Mandelgroove
Orlando Theatre Sampler
Audio Video: The Making of Blue Man Group's Debut Album

Music videos
PVC IV
Mandelgroove
Cat Video
Modern Plumbing
Sing Along
The Current
Exhibit 13
Drum Finale Throwdown
Light Suits
I Feel Love
Rock and Go
Rods and Cones
Canta Conmigo (Original Mix)
Canta Conmigo (Funky Junction)

 
Discographies of American artists
Pop music group discographies